John Ross Gilligan (1884 – 1946) was a Scottish footballer who played as a defender, almost solely for Clyde.

In his first season with the club (having quickly moved on from his first professional appointment on the other side of Glasgow at Partick Thistle), he won the 1904–05 Scottish Division Two title. The team was relegated, but gained promotion again in 1906 and  retained their place in the top tier for the rest of his time there, including two third-place finishes which equal their all-time highest placings. He also played in the 1912 Scottish Cup Final which Clyde lost to Celtic.

The sole representative honour Gilligan received was a selection for the Glasgow Football Association's annual challenge match against Sheffield in 1909. In 1911 he was granted a benefit match against his hometown club Dundee.

He was the youngest of four brothers who were professional footballers, the others being Sandy, Billy and Sam.

References

1884 births
1946 deaths
Scottish footballers
Scottish people of Irish descent
Footballers from Dundee
Scottish Junior Football Association players
Scottish Football League players
Association football defenders
Dundee Wanderers F.C. players
East Craigie F.C. players
Partick Thistle F.C. players
Clyde F.C. players